Nezer may refer to:

Christoforos Nezer (Bavarian) (1808–1883), Bavarian officer who settled in Greece
Christoforos Nezer (d. 1970) (1887–1970), Greek actor who as the cousin of Marika Nezer
Christoforos Nezer (d. 1996) (1903–1996), Greek actor and brother of Marika Nezer
Marika Nezer (1906–1989), Greek actress